A by-election was held for the New South Wales Legislative Assembly electorate of St Leonards on 24 October 1887 because of the resignation of Sir Henry Parkes due to insolvency, having assigned his estate for the benefit of his creditors.

Dates

Result

Sir Henry Parkes resigned due to insolvency.

See also
Electoral results for the district of St Leonards
List of New South Wales state by-elections

References

1887 elections in Australia
New South Wales state by-elections
1880s in New South Wales